Hjertestop is a Danish punk band. It was formed in Copenhagen, in the scene around Ungdomshuset. The band consists of former members of Incontrollados, Død Ungdom, Young Wasteners, and Leathervein.
Since 2004, the band have been playing concerts all over Europe, on 6–7 small tours and 2 larger tours.
Amongst countries they have played in, is Norway, Germany, the Netherlands, Belgium, Czech Republic, Austria, Switzerland, Italy, France, Croatia, Ireland, Sweden, Finland, Turkey, Spain, Basque Country and the United States.

Members
Las Ballade (Vocals and bass) 2004–11
Jesper (Drums) 2008–11
Nikolaj (Guitar) 2004–11

Former members:

Yogi (Vocal) 2004–05
Hasse (Drums) 2004–08

Discography
Hjertestop Demo CS (Maximum OD/Kick'n'Punch, 2004)
Åårh fuck! Det er Hjertestop! 7" (Kick'n'Punch, 2005/Fashionable Idiots, 2008)
Vi ses i Helvede LP (Hjernespind, 2008/No Way Records, 2009)
Musik for dekadente orer 7" (Kick'n'Punch, 2010/Fashionable Idiots, 2010)

Compilations
København 2005 CS (2005)

See also
 List of Danish punk bands

External links
Hjertestop´s Myspace site
Interview from 2009
Interview from 2005 
Free legal download of EP and LP
European record label Hjernespind Records´ website
American record label No Way Records´ website
American record labels Fashionable Idiots´ website

Danish hardcore punk groups